Liran is a small island off the southwest coast of Wetar Island, Indonesia. Administratively it is part of West Wetar District (Kecamatan Wetar Barat) within the Southwest Maluku Regency (Kabupaten Maluku Barat Daya). The East Timorese island Atauro is 12 km to the southwest. Liran is the westernmost of the Barat Daya Islands in the province of Maluku. It covers an area of 39.14 km2 (including minor offshore islands) and had 841 inhabitants in 2019.

Liran is surrounded by coral reefs.

It has a small population, who speak Wetarese. They primarily live in the small village Ustutun on the east coast of the island, which also serves as the administrative centre for the West Wetar District. There is also a lighthouse.

References

External links
Satellite photo of Liran, off the coast of Wetar

Barat Daya Islands
Islands of the Maluku Islands
Populated places in Indonesia